Ryuju Nagayama (born 15 April 1996) is a Japanese judoka.

He participated at the 2018 World Judo Championships, winning a medal.

References

External links
 

1996 births
Living people
Japanese male judoka
21st-century Japanese people